Purdi is a village in Paide Parish, Järva County in northern-central Estonia.

Purdi manor
Purdi manor has a history that goes back to at least 1560. The current building is a baroque manor house, built in circa 1760-1770 by the von Baranoff family. Some baroque interiors still survive. Additions to the building were made in the 19th century. Several annexes belonging to the estate are still preserved, notably the granary, as well as the baroque burial chapel of the Ungern-Sternberg family, who were the last feudal landlords of the estate.

Gallery

References

External links
Purdi manor at Estonian Manors Portal

Villages in Järva County
Manor houses in Estonia
Kreis Jerwen